Simon Elkyngton was the member of Parliament for Great Grimsby in 1421 and 1422. He was mayor of the town in 1429–30 and 1440–41.

References 

Year of birth missing
Year of death missing
Mayors of Grimsby
English MPs May 1421
Members of the Parliament of England for Great Grimsby
English MPs 1422